Guhrej (also Romanized as Gūhrej; also known as Gohrej-e Pā’īn) is a village in Saghder Rural District, Jebalbarez District, Jiroft County, Kerman Province, Iran. At the 2006 census, its population was 94, in 25 families.

References 

Populated places in Jiroft County